Happy Truck ng Bayan is a noontime variety show produced by the TV5's entertainment division and it was started airing since June 14, 2015. HTNB is airing every Sunday, 11:00am to 1:00pm on TV5, and it is the biggest project to date this year by the network and hosted by majority of the network's bunch of talents collectively known as "HappyPeeps".

Initially, HTNB visited selected barangays and places in Metro Manila (Manila, San Juan, Marikina, Quezon City, Caloocan, Valenzuela, to name a few) and Central Luzon (Pampanga), using a roving truck that transformed into a stage using remote control hydraulics system, with various segments and games cater to the growing number of audiences from Class D & E (masa).

Competed against long-time rivals ASAP of ABS-CBN, Sunday All Stars of GMA Network and its successor, the comedy-and-variety show Sunday PinaSaya, it was the brainchild project of TV5's Entertainment Division Head Wilma Galvante. HTNB also served as drive for advertisers and sponsors thru on-ground and below-the-line activation events and pluggings for the network's new shows.

HTNB did "taped as LIVE" shows in different parts of the country, in Northern Luzon, Southern Luzon, Visayas and Mindanao.

The show ended on February 7, 2016. It will be replaced by a similarly formatted program, Happy Truck HAPPinas, set to premiere live on March 6, 2016 at 11am.

Cast

Main hosts
Ogie Alcasid
Janno Gibbs
Derek Ramsay
Gelli de Belen

Co-hosts
Mark Neumann
Shaira Diaz
Empoy Marquez
Tuesday Vargas 
Martin Escudero
Eula Caballero
Alwyn Uytingco
Jingo Ismol
Toni Rodriguez-Aquino
Kim Idol
Tom Taus
Ritz Azul

Featuring 
SexBomb Girls

Former cast
Valeen Montenegro (moved to GMA Network)
Mariel Rodriguez (returned to ABS-CBN) 
Vin Abrenica (moved to ABS-CBN)
Jasmine Curtis-Smith (moved to GMA Network)
Akihiro Blanco (moved to ABS-CBN)
Empoy Marquez (returned to ABS-CBN)

Segments
Barangay Most Wanted
Bida ng Dance Floor
Ooohhh... Construction Worker - male personality search
Barangay Bayani - nomination and voting for the most deserved neighbors of the barangay
Ready, Set, Goma!
Ta-Wattpad 
Sing-Ko - musical segment of Janno and Ogie (similar to their segment "Sobrang OJ Pare" then on SOP)
Kwarta o Kwar-truck - segment on the final stretch of the show where the winner will take home P300,000 jackpot inside the lucky capsule

See also
List of programs broadcast by TV5

References

External links
TV5 website

TV5 (Philippine TV network) original programming
2015 Philippine television series debuts
2016 Philippine television series endings
Philippine variety television shows
Filipino-language television shows